Farmers Trading Company Ltd (branded as Farmers) is a New Zealand mid-market department store chain. Headquartered in Flat Bush, Auckland, Farmers operates 59 stores across New Zealand, specialising in family fashion, beauty, homewares, furniture, large appliances and whiteware.

History 

Robert Laidlaw founded Laidlaw Leeds in 1909, which sold agricultural supplies through mail order catalogues, following a successful American model. In 1910, a group of Auckland members of the Farmers Union formed the Farmers Union Indenting and Trading Association. The Clevedon branch, for instance, approved the formation of such an association at a meeting held in July 1910. In 1916, the trading association was converted into the Farmers' Union Trading Co (Auckland) Ltd. In 1917, the Farmers' Union Trading Company approached Laidlaw Leeds with an offer to merge, which Laidlaw accepted; he became the managing director of the new venture, the Farmers' Trading Company. The company soon expanded into retail and adopted the department store model. There had also been an unrelated, older Farmers Department Store in Sydney, Australia.

The centre of operations was a high rise warehouse and office complex in Auckland's Hobson Street. In 1920 a retail space was opened to the public in the building. The co-op also bought many local stores in the Auckland province in 1920, by which time it had 32 stores, and offered preference shares to urban members.

In the 1930s a large wing was built onto the older 1914 building which included the Harbour View Tea Rooms. The architect involved, R. A. Lippencott, also gave the enlarged building a new facade in the new modern Art-Deco style. Hobson Street was not a very good position for a department store, so copying similar arrangement by stores in American cities, Laidlaw arranged for a free bus to shuttle people from Queen Street to the Hobson Street store. This was later augmented by a free tram to Karangahape Road.

Over successive years the adjacent sites were covered with warehouses and administration blocks for the growing business. Laidlaw, a teetotaler, made a point of buying the pub directly next door, The Grosvenor, and turning it into offices. As well as its roof top playground and tearooms, Farmers was also noted for its high-rise parking building connected to the shop by an elevated sky way. Like many buildings from the 1920s onwards it had electric lifts which multiplied in number as the building grew in size. The store also boasted the first escalators in Auckland which were opened in 1955 by the Mayor of Auckland, Mr J H Luxford and Mrs Luxford. The Mayor cut the ribbon and the official party travelled up the escalators followed by a crowd of curious Aucklanders, along with the store's mascot Hector the parrot. The eight banks of escalators were the largest installation in the Southern Hemisphere.

In 1982 Bunting & Co. bought the South Island Farmers-Haywrights chain and Farmers bought 13 stores for $12 Million, with this the store count was brought to 80.

After closing in 1991, the large CBD store stood empty for several years before it was converted into an upscale hotel which opened in 1998. Currently, most Farmers stores are anchor stores in shopping malls, with their larger stores in the suburbs.

The company grew from one store during the 1910s to 56 by 1990 through opportunism and take-overs. Farmers and the DEKA discount merchandise chain were joined as Farmers Deka Ltd from 1992. The DEKA chain closed in July 2001 after financial difficulty in competing with The Warehouse discount stores. Farmers Deka Ltd was then renamed Farmers Holdings Ltd.

Farmers has traditionally been a middle market retailer, on par with Sears or J C Penney in the United States. With the recent development of The Warehouse (a Walmart type store), Farmers made a decision to become a far more fashionable shopping destination, ranging an increasing amount of branded product. Where Farmers once would have faced competition from The Warehouse (nationwide) and various small chain stores, they've established themselves well apart from this discount retailer. Farmers still face competition from remaining department stores Smith & Caughey's, Ballantynes, and H & J Smith, none of which are nationwide.

Farmers closed its Queen Street, Auckland, store in rented premises in 2014 at the conclusion of a long-term lease. In November 2015, the company opened a new store located on the corner of Queen and Victoria Streets, formerly occupied by stationery retailer Whitcoulls, renovating it as a three-level Farmers department store.

More recently, Farmers has moved into online sales, including as it has acquired brands such as Stevens and closed their standalone stores.  Farmers has received very poor reviews for its online service, with TrustPilot currently scoring Farmers at 1.6 out of 5.  The online sales reviews on TrustPilot score well below this.  The reviews reflect under-investment in the infrastructure needed to sustain a successful online business.

Departments 
Farmers departments include womenswear, beauty, including serviced cosmetics, fine fragrance, health & beauty and sunglasses; lingerie, including sleepwear; menswear including mercery; accessories, footwear, and luggage; home, including kitchenware, tableware, giftware and laundry; manchester including bathroomware; small appliances; children's including childrenswear, nursery, and toys; furniture; with electronics and large appliances/whiteware in flagship stores such as Albany and St Lukes. Christmas Shop and confectionery appear October–December. Fellow James Pascoe Group companies Goldmark (previously fellow JPG brand Prouds) and Stevens also have store-within-a-store outlets within selected Farmers stores.

Since the 2003 purchase by the James Pascoe Group, the chain has focussed on the lucrative fashion apparel and beauty categories. Unprofitable and loss-making departments such as hardware and computers were discontinued.

Ownership 
Farmers Holdings Ltd is privately owned by the James Pascoe Group, in turn owned by Anne Norman and family. James Pascoe Ltd and Fisher & Paykel Finance bought Farmers on 6 November 2003 from Foodlands Associates for NZ$311m. The business was split into the retail and finance arms with James Pascoe holding the retail arm and Fisher & Paykel Finance the finance arm which includes the Farmers Finance Card.

Gallery

References

External links

 Farmers Website
 Farmers Beauty Website

Department stores of New Zealand
Retail companies established in 1909
Companies based in Auckland